Macks Creek is a stream in Dallas and Camden counties in the U.S. state of Missouri. It is a tributary of the Little Niangua River.

The stream flows north into Camden County through Black Hollow and turns west after crossing under U.S. Route 54 at the community of Macks Creek.

The stream and community most likely was named after the local Mack or Hack family of early settlers in the area.

References

Rivers of Missouri
Rivers of Camden County, Missouri
Rivers of Dallas County, Missouri